Naagam is a 1985 Indian Tamil-language horror film, directed by Chozha Rajan and produced by N. Radha. The film stars Ambika, Chandrasekhar and Radha Ravi.

Cast
Ambika as Janaki
Chandrasekhar
Radha Ravi as Ravi
Arjun as CID officer
Sasikala as Gowri
S. S. Chandran
V. K. Ramasamy
Kallapetti Singaram as Velu
Anuradha
Sunitha
Gundu Kalyanam

Soundtrack
The music was composed by Shankar–Ganesh.

References

1985 films
1980s Tamil-language films
Films scored by Shankar–Ganesh